Bücker Flugzeugbau was a German aircraft manufacturer.

Bücker may also refer to:

André Bücker (born 1969), German theatre director
Theo Bücker (born 1948), German football manager and former player

See also

Bucker (disambiguation)
Buecker (disambiguation)
Büker, surname